The , also known as Kyoto City Subway, is the rapid transit network in the city of Kyoto, Japan. Operated by the Kyoto Municipal Transportation Bureau, it has two lines.

Lines 

Rolling stock

Karasuma Line 
 Kyoto Municipal Subway 10 series
 Kyoto Municipal Subway 20 series
 Kintetsu 3200 series
 Kintetsu 3220 series

Tozai Line 
 Kyoto Municipal Subway 50 series
 Keihan 800 series

Network Map

See also 
 Transport in Keihanshin
 List of metro systems

Notes

References

External links 

Kyoto City Bus & Subway Information Guide (Official website)
Network map (to scale)
Kyoto Municipal Subway map

 
Transport in Kyoto